Joseph W. Pace II (born October 20, 1965) is an American gospel musician. He started his music career, in 1996, with Colorado Mass Choir. They have released fourteen albums with eleven of them charting on the Billboard magazine Gospel Albums chart. He has released albums with a myriad of label imprints, such as the following: Zomba Records, Verity Records, Alliant Records, Word Records, Epic Records, Integrity Music, Columbia Records, NuSpring Music, Sony Music, and Tyscot Records.

Early life
Pace was born on October 20, 1965 in Homestead, Florida, as Joseph W. Pace II, which his father served in the military causing the family to relocate often. His father is a pastor at a church in Montgomery, Alabama. His father serving in the military was the reason the family relocated to Colorado, so this was the impetus for the birth of Joe Pace & the Colorado Mass Choir. He is an ordained Baptist and Church of God in Christ preacher, and he got his honorary doctorate from Inman Bible College.

Music career
His music career began in 1996, with the Colorado Mass Choir that formed in 1995, who were choir members from various churches in Colorado. He has released fourteen albums, with all but three of those charting on the Billboard magazine Gospel Albums chart. His albums were the following: 1997's Watch God Move with Zomba Records, 1998's So Good! with Verity Records, 1999's God's Got It with Verity Records, 2001's Joe Pace Presents: Let There Be Praise with Word Records, Epic Records, and Integrity Music, 2001's Glad About It with Word, Epic, and Integrity, 2002's Joe Pace Presents: Shake the Foundation with Integrity, 2002' In the Spirit with Integrity, 2003's Speak Life with Integrity, 2004's Joe Pace Presents: Sunday Morning Service with Integrity and Epic, 2006's Might Long Way with Columbia Records, 2006's Praise 'Til You Breakthrough with Alliant Records, 2007's Joe Pace Presents: Worship for the Kingdom with NuSpring Music, 2007's Joe Pace Presents: Worship for the Kids with Sony Music, and 2010's Joe Pace Presents: Praise for the Sanctuary with Tyscot Records. These albums charted on the Billboard magazine Gospel Albums chart, except for Speak Life, Praise 'Til You Breakthrough, and Joe Pace Presents: Worship for the Kids. He won the Stellar Award for New Artist of the year in 1997 with The Colorado Mass Choir.

Discography

References

External links
 Official website

1965 births
Living people
African-American songwriters
African-American Christians
Musicians from Colorado
Musicians from Florida
Songwriters from Colorado
Songwriters from Florida
Epic Records artists
Columbia Records artists
21st-century African-American people
20th-century African-American people